W.M. Hunt is a photography collector, curator and consultant who lives and works in New York.

Career

Collection
Hunt has been collecting photos since the 1960s.  His "Collection Blind Pirate" has been the source for "Hunt's Three Ring Circus:  American Groups Before 1950" which was exhibited in collaboration with the International Center of Photography at the UBS Building, 1285 Avenue of the Americas Gallery (2015-2016); as "Foule - Hunt's Three Ring Circus", Rencontres d'Arles, France (2014); as "Work Force: American Groups before 1960" at Foto Industria, Bologna (2013); and as "RE: groups - American Photographs before 1960" at Fotofest at the Houston Center for Photography (2010).

Highlights from his collection Dancing Bear — "magical, heart-stoppng images of people in which you cannot see the eyes" — have been shown at the George Eastman House International Museum of Photography and Film in Rochester, NY as "The Unseen Eye: Photographs from the W.M. Hunt Collection (2011-2012); at FOAM Fotografiemuseum, Amsterdam, The Netherlands as "Oog - Eye" (2007); "Sans Regard - Les Etranges Portraits de la Collection Dancing Bear de W.M. Hunt", Musée de l'Élysée Lausanne, Switzerland (2006); at the Rencontres de la Photographie, Arles, France as "Sans Regard or No Eyes: Selections from W.M. Hunt/Collection Dancing Bear" (2005).

Other installations include the Appleton Museum in Ocala, FL as "The Unseen Eye" in 2010, Blue Sky Gallery in Portland, Oregon as "The Unseen Eye" in 2012 as well as the Lawrenceville School, New Jersey as "Seeing" in 1993.  

Selections from both collections were included in "Worthy Pictures" in "The Past is Prologue" at the Art Yard, Frenchtown, NY in 2019 and "oo's & iii's: an unusual and unexpected melange, mess, miscellany, mishmash, and mix of inspired selections from the photography collections of W.M. Hunt, for the Fotofestiwal in Lodz, Poland, in 2020.

Books
His book "The Unseen Eye: Photographs from the Unconscious" was published in 2011 by Aperture (US) and Thames & Hudson (UK) and by Actes Sud as "L'Oeil Invisible" in France.  It focuses on his "Collection Dancing Bear".  "Hunt's Three Ring Circus: American Groups before 1950," "Huddled Masses" and "Troop/Troupe" were published by Dancing Bear Books in 2014 and 2018 respectively.  He collaborated on "two narcissists walk into a bar" with Gerald Slota in 2019 (also Dancing Bear Books).

He has written for monographs on Bill Armstrong (with whom he collaborated on a performance piece "Thinking in Color"), Mark Beard, Luca Campigotto, Ahmet Ertug, Andy Freeberg, Manuel Geerinck, Larry Gianettino, Michael Grecco, Ron Haviv, Josef Hoflehner, Bohnchang Koo, David Julian Leonard, Martino Marangoni, Lauren Marsolier, Erwin Olaf, Jeff Sheng, Mickey Smith, Phillip Toledano, Paolo Ventura, and Frank Yamrus.

He made his major publishing debut when guest edited "delirium," an issue of the quarterly Aperture (No. 148, Summer 1997).

His writing also appears in Aperture's The Photo Book Review, PDN (Photo District News), Daylight, PhotoVision, Portfolio, Next Level, SPOT, etc.

Hunt was a founding supporter and a frequent contributor to L'Oeil de la Photographie.

Speaker
Hunt was an adjunct professor at The School of Visual Arts, and he continues to give workshops at Aperture, ICP, Maine Media Workshop and universities and art fairs.  For more than twenty years he organized and moderated the "Your Picture ... " series for PDN at Photo Expo.  

His talks and workshops on photography are variously titled "How I Look at Photographs", "How to Get What You Want" (with the artist Cig Harvey), "The Unseen Eye: A Life in Photographs and other digressions ...", "A Conversation in Color" and "The Walls of the Dancing Bear Cave or $#!? Lugged Home" in the US and internationally.

Dealer
Founding partner of the photography gallery Hasted Hunt in Chelsea, Manhattan, and former director of photography at Ricco/Maresca gallery, W.M. Hunt debuted and represented artists including Lillian Bassman, Wilson "Snowflake" Bentley, Edward Burtynsky, Elinor Carucci, Lynne Cohen, Luc Delahaye, Julian Faulhaber, Andreas Gefeller, Larry Gianettino, Jean-Paul Goude, Luis Mallo, Michael Martone, Lisette Model, James Mollison, Erwin Olaf, Eugene Richards, Martin Schoeller, Gerald Slota, Eric Solomon, Paulo Ventura, VII (Photo Agency), Alex Webb, Joel-Peter Witkin and Michael Wolf. Further he organized survey shows including "BOOM!", "Bird," "Colour Before Color (curated by Martin Parr), "Family," "Stripes and Stars: The American Flag in Outsider and Folk Art and Photography," and "Humankind" through the lens of (the photo agency) VII.

Other
Hunt has been Chief Judge and Host of the SONY World Photography Organization Awards in London as well as judge or nominator for World Press Photo, Prix Pictet, Critical Mass, Getty Images, PDN, etc. as well as a portfolio reviewer at Houston's Fotofest, The New York Times Portfolio Review, Photo Lucida, Photo NOLA, Format UK, etc.

Hunt is on the Board of Directors of the W. Eugene Smith Memorial Fund and has served on the boards of The Center for Photography at Woodstock (Vision Award 2009), AIPAD (Association of International Photography Art Dealers) and as past Chairman of Photographers + Friends United Against AIDS and The Harry M. Stevens family Foundation.   

He is a former actor whose last stage performance was in "The Rise of David Levinsky" (1987) and on film in "The Bonfire of the Vanities" (1990). He is featured as himself in "The Many Sad Fates of Philip Toledano" (2015).

Exhibitions

"Delirium" Ricco/Maresca, New York, 1995
"Grace" The Center for Photography at Woodstock, 1996
"Sans Regard or No Eyes: Photographs from W.M. Hunt / Collection Dancing Bear" Rencontres de la Photographie, Arles, France, 2005
"San Regard: La Collection Dancing Bear de W.M. Hunt" Musée de l'Élysée, Lausanne, Switzerland, 2006
"Eye: The Dancing Bear Collection of W.M. Hunt" Foam Fotografiemuseum Amsterdam, The Netherlands, 2007
"VII @ Galapagos" New York Photo Festival, New York, 2008 
"RE: groups" Houston Center for Photography, Houston, 2010
"The Unseen Eye" Appleton Museum of Art, Florida, 2010
"I Get A Sickening Feeling Every Time I Think Of It - Ten from 2010" VII Gallery, DUMBO, Brooklyn, 2010
"Photographs from the W.M. Hunt Collection exhibition George Eastman House"

References

External links 
 Conscientious Extended: A Conversation with Bill Hunt
 MOSSLESS Interviews: WM Hunt (video)
 Ciel Variable: Hide and Seek in a Photograph Collection
 World Photo Org's Real Stories: Interview with Bill Hunt (video)
 France 2: Le Festival De Photos D'Arles (video) (French)
 Rencontres de la Photographie à Arles 2005 / I am the collection / W.M. Hunt
 New York Photo Festival 2008 / Interview with Bill Hunt (video)
 WM Hunt

Living people
Photography curators
Year of birth missing (living people)